Bliss was a monthly British magazine aimed at 14- to 17-year-old girls, retailing at £2.75 and often coming with a gift such as make-up or a bag. The content covered candid celebrity gossip, latest fashions, hair and make-up looks, a problem page on puberty, boyfriends, friends and sex, an interview with the celebrity cover girl, entertainment reviews, romance advice, psychology for friendships, and real-life stories.

The magazine was launched by EMAP in June 1995, and sold to Italian publishers Panini in 2006. At the time of its sale in 2006, it had a circulation of 213,466 (already in decline), but this had fallen to 50,043 by December 2012.

In June 2014, it was announced the July issue - already on newsstands - would be the last.

Features
Taylor Swift graced the September 2009 cover in a dress designed by David Peck of 11:11.

References

1995 establishments in the United Kingdom
2014 disestablishments in the United Kingdom
Defunct magazines published in the United Kingdom
Lifestyle magazines published in the United Kingdom
Magazines established in 1995
Magazines disestablished in 2014
Monthly magazines published in the United Kingdom
Teen magazines